Eldersfield is a village and civil parish in the Malvern Hills district of Worcestershire, England. It stands exactly ten miles east of Ledbury and ten miles north of Gloucester; this fact can be found on a milestone on the side of the B4211 road that runs through Corse Lawn.

History

Gadbury Camp
The Iron Age fort of Gadbury Camp can be found in the parish, to the east of the village, on a hill overlooking the river valley of the Leadon and Severn. It was surrounded by a single massive rampart, making it a rare "univallate" construction. The camp area is 10 acres, is 100m wide at its widest point and has 400m of ramparts. It was settled during the fourth century BC to first centuries AD, and would have been a place where subsistence and craft goods were redistributed. Finds at the site include an Iron Age statue and Roman coins.

It is now a listed monument.

Parish Church
The parish church is dedicated to St. John the Baptist and is in the Diocese of Worcester.  The parish registers survive from 1718, and there are bishops' transcripts for the earlier registers starting in 1561. 

In 1619, the vicar of Eldersfield Gerard Prior preached against the use of Sunday's for leisure and games, under the Declaration of Sports, asking that "the King's heart might be turned from profanenes, vanity and popery". He was suspended, but later reinstated.

The Savage family were the local worthies and numerous of their 17th-century tombs in the church and graves in the churchyard were recorded by Treadway Russell Nash c1780, including Christopher Savage gent. (1600-1681).<ref>Collections for the History of Worcestershire, 2 vols. by Treadway Russell Nash, 1781/2.</ref>
Enclosure of Commons
Acts for enclosing lands were passed in 1836, 1840 and 1861.

References

External links

Eldersfield entry in A History of the County of Worcester: volume 4
Eldersfield Church
Eldersfield Marsh
Marsh Court
The Pigeon House
Eldersfield entry in John Noake's Guide to Worcestershire'' (1868) 
Eldersfield 1891 Census Results

Villages in Worcestershire
Civil parishes in Worcestershire